EIDD-036, also known as EPRX-036, as well as progesterone 20-oxime (P4-20-O) or 20-(hydroxyimino)pregn-4-en-3-one, is a synthetic, water-soluble analogue of progesterone, a neurosteroid, and the active metabolite of EIDD-1723 (EPRX-01723), a medication developed for the potential treatment of traumatic brain injury.

See also
 List of neurosteroids § Inhibitory > Synthetic > Pregnanes
 List of progestogen esters § Oximes of progesterone derivatives

References

Experimental drugs
Human drug metabolites
Enones
Neuroprotective agents
Neurosteroids
Pregnanes
Steroid oximes
Ketoximes